Stibb is a hamlet near Bude in Cornwall, England, United Kingdom.

Stibb lies within the Cornwall Area of Outstanding Natural Beauty (AONB).

References

External links

Dinscott Tank and Military Collection in Stibb, Bude

Hamlets in Cornwall